Kenneth Morley (born 17 January 1943) is an English actor and comedian best known for playing the role of Reg Holdsworth in the ITV soap opera Coronation Street from 1989 to 1995 and General Leopold von Flockenstuffen in the BBC sitcom 'Allo 'Allo! from 1988 to 1991.

Early life 

Morley was born in Chorley Hospital in Chorley, Lancashire. He was the only child born to engineer father Frank Morley and his mother Phyllis Morley. He was educated at St. Peter's Church of England School and Elementary School until the age of twelve and then he attended Ashworth College until he was fifteen. Morley left school with no qualifications. Ken trained as an apprentice mechanic and in September 1963 he enrolled at Alston Hall College where he gained six O Levels and two A Levels. In 1966, he moved to London to become a primary school teacher in Holloway Road. He then moved back to Lancashire and became a supply teacher, mainly in History and English. Later in his teaching career, Ken was a teacher at Smithills High School in Bolton, Craigmount School in Edinburgh and Archbishop Tenison's School in London.

Career 
Morley has been a regular on British television since the 1970s, his earliest role being in an episode of The Fall and Rise of Reginald Perrin. His first major television role was playing General Leopold von Flockenstuffen in the BBC war sitcom 'Allo 'Allo! starring in the show from 1988 to 1991.In 1988 Ken appeared as a twitcher in the Christmas special on the TV comedy series Watching. From 1989 to 1995, he played eccentric shop manager Reg Holdsworth on Coronation Street. He became a household name for the role of Reg Holdsworth and the character's spectacle glasses. He left the show in 1995, to pursue other acting roles and projects. In 1997, he appeared as a Librarian in the children's television show Woof! and guest starred as Nazi Captain Voorhese in the sitcom Red Dwarf. In 1998, he appeared in an episode of the television show The Grand as Harry Frindel. In 1999, Morley returned to Coronation Street in the spin-off show Coronation Street: After Hours alongside former Coronation Street actress Julie Goodyear. He has also appeared in Emmerdale spin-off show Emmerdale: Don't Look Now! - The Dingles in Venice playing Reg Holdsworth.

In 2003 to 2004, Morley starred in the sitcom Hardware as Rex alongside Martin Freeman.

In 2005, he was a contestant in the ITV television show Celebrity Fit Club, where he lost over two stone.

Morley also appears in the adverts for Safestyle UK double glazing windows. He features as a character similar to Reg Holdsworth.

Morley is a pantomime favourite and has appeared in many pantomimes including: Jack and the Beanstalk, Aladdin, Snow White, Sleeping Beauty and lots more.

In 2010, Morley returned to Coronation Street in the 50th Anniversary Special Coronation Street: A Knights Tale alongside former Coronation Street actor Kevin Kennedy who played Curly Watts.

In 2011, he appeared in an episode of the children's television show Sooty as Hurbert Fanshawe.

Morley has promoted and appeared in the adverts Coronation Street Bingo for Gala Bingo.

In 2014, he guest starred in the ITV sitcom Benidorm as Herbert.

In mid 2014, he was a contestant in the BBC cookery show Celebrity Masterchef.

In January 2015, Morley participated in the fifteenth series of the Channel 5 show Celebrity Big Brother. He entered the house on Day 1, 7 January, as a Housemate and Contestant. On 12 January he was removed from the Big Brother house for using "racist and sexist language". Ofcom had earlier received 233 complaints about his behaviour. His wife defended Morley, explaining: "I think possibly - how should I put it - he’s been reading lots of Jacobean and Shakespearean drama. He will have watched Breaking Bad as well. I know my son’s got it. He would have got it from there."

Personal life 
Morley married secondary school teacher Sue on 27 July 1989 at Woolwich Town Hall.

Morley has been associated with several criminal incidents against him in recent years; it was reported in October 2007 that his wife had been attacked during an armed raid on their house, and five years earlier, in 2002, he was the victim of a mugging by a group of youths who stole his trademark glasses, which were later recovered.

Morley has had a fascination with cars since he was young. He was an avid car collector, his collection included:
1956 Ford Fairlane
1959 pink Cadillac Coupe de Ville
two 1976 Cadillac Fleetwood Brougham – one since sold

Filmography

Guest appearances 
Supermarket Sweep (1993) – 1 episode
Celebrity Squares (1993) – 3 episodes
Surprise Surprise (1994) – 1 episode
Live Talk (2000) – 1 Episode
This Morning (2000) – 1 episode
The Weakest Link (2003) – Soap Star Special – 1 episode
This Morning (2003) – 1 episode
Celebrities Under Pressure (2004) – 1 episode
Today with Des and Mel (2004) – 1 episode
Dick and Dom in da Bungalow (2004) – 1 episode
Loose Women (2006) – 1 episode
Richard & Judy (2009) – 1 episode
Come Dine with Me (2010) – Coronation Street Special – 1 episode
Loose Women (2010) – 2 episodes
This Morning (2010) – 1 episode
BBC Breakfast (2011) – 1 episode
Pointless Celebrities (2012) – 1 episode
Loose Women (2012) – 1 episode
Celebrity Five Go To... (2012) – 4 episodes
Piers Morgan's Life Stories (2013) – 1 episode

References

External links 

1943 births
Living people
English male soap opera actors
People from Chorley
Male actors from Lancashire
Male actors from Manchester
Comedians from Lancashire
Comedians from Manchester
English male stage actors